The Emerald is a mixed-use 40-story skyscraper in downtown Seattle, Washington, United States. The tower includes 262 luxury condominiums, retail space, and amenity spaces on outdoor terraces. It began construction in July 2017 and was completed in October 2020.

History

The site, at the southwest corner of 2nd Avenue and Stewart Street, was home to the two-story Ames Building (also known as the MJA Building) from 1914 to 2017. Atlanta-based real estate developers Wood Partners filed plans to develop a  residential tower at the site in March 2014, while property owner Principal Global Investors submitted the Ames Building for landmark status. The Landmarks Preservation Board rejected landmark status for the Ames Building in August, allowing for it to be demolished for the new tower. Wood Partners and Hewitt Architects submitted an initial design plan to the city in December, proposing that the tower's upper 24 stories cantilever over the adjacent Broadacres Building.

After a series of design review meetings in 2015, the number of residential units in the building was reduced from 230 to 177, and the number of parking spaces was increased and split between underground and above-grade levels. The project and property was sold to a Chinese developer, Create World America, for $17.1 million in June 2016, with plans to convert the residential units into condominiums. A revised design with 266 condominiums, additional retail space, and reduced, underground-only parking was unveiled in January 2017, along with the building's name, "The Emerald", inspired by Seattle's nickname of the "Emerald City".

Construction of The Emerald began in July 2017 and it was topped out two years later. It was originally scheduled to be complete by March 2020, but was pushed back to September due to the COVID-19 pandemic. , 25 percent of units at The Emerald had been reserved by buyers. The building was completed in October 2020.

Design

The upper floors include 22 penthouse units that cost between $2 million and $10.5 million for a  unit. Two amenity areas, located on the rooftop and on the third floor, include a fitness center, pet spa, yoga studio, and outdoor balconies with views of Pike Place Market and the Olympic Mountains. Residents also have access to a fleet of on-demand Tesla electric cars through a smartphone app. The Emerald has 62 parking stalls, the lowest stalls-per-unit ratio of any new residential building in Downtown Seattle, and has 20 additional spaces leased from the adjacent Thompson Hotel.

References

Buildings and structures under construction in the United States
Residential skyscrapers in Seattle